Playground is a Canadian short film television series which aired on CBC Television in 1962.

Premise
This series featured material from the National Film Board of Canada, typically two short films per episode situated in regions of Canada which receive less recognition. The series run included films on Newfoundland,  northern Ontario fishing, the Shubenacadie sanctuary in Nova Scotia with its wildlife and the Yukon.

Scheduling
This half-hour series was broadcast on Wednesdays at 4:00 p.m. from 4 July to 26 September 1962.

References

External links
 

CBC Television original programming
1962 Canadian television series debuts
1962 Canadian television series endings
National Film Board of Canada documentary series